Frary is a surname. Notable people with the surname include:

Donald Paige Frary (1893-1919), American professor and author
Frank P. Frary (1856–1911), American politician
Michael Frary (1918–2005), American artist
Ralph Frary (1876–1925), American baseball player and umpire